This is an incomplete list of Azerbaijan legislation, in chronological order.

 1996 - Law on Copyright and Related Rights (Law No. 438, 05.06.1996)
 1997 - Law on Patents
 1998 - Law on Trademarks and Geographic Names
 1998 - Law on Information, Informatization, and Information Protection (03.04.1998)
 1998 - Law on Citizenship (30.09.1998)
 2005 - Freedom of Information Act

External links
 Intellectual Property in Azerbaijan

Azerbaijan
 
Legislation